"Memories" is a song by the band Weezer. It is the opening track and first single from their 2010 album Hurley  and was first released online on August 10, 2010, to promote the comedy film Jackass 3D. Following the death of Jackass member Ryan Dunn, the video became the most searched for video on YouTube.

Composition
Michael Hann of The Guardian said that the song "harks back to the days when Weezer seemed like a fresh, slightly puzzled take on grunge".

Music video
The music video for "Memories" debuted on September 9, 2010, on the TV show Jersey Shore. The video was shot on Super 8 cameras and filmed on the locations of the skate video "The Search for Animal Chin". The clip features Weezer playing next to and inside an empty pool while various skateboarders do tricks around them. The video track also features the cast of Jackass on backing vocals, and clips from the movie Jackass 3D.

Track listing

"Memories" - 3:16

Chart positions

References

Weezer songs
2010 singles
Songs written by Rivers Cuomo
2010 songs
Epitaph Records singles